Timothy A. Boetsch (born January 28, 1981) is a retired American professional mixed martial artist who fought in the Middleweight and Light Heavyweight divisions of the Ultimate Fighting Championship. A professional since 2006, Boetsch has formerly competed as an alternate for the New York Pitbulls in the International Fight League and King of the Cage.

Background
Boetsch was born in Lincolnville, Maine, and has a brother, Aaron, who is ten years older than him. Boetsch began wrestling when he was six years old, and had always admired his older brother's wrestling abilities. Boetsch, who also practiced Jeet Kune Do, attended Camden Hills Regional High School, where he was very successful at the local high school level. Boetsch was a four-time state wrestling champion, and won almost every tournament that he participated in. On August 4, 2012, he was inducted into the Maine Wrestling Hall of Fame. He then attended Lock Haven University of Pennsylvania on a wrestling scholarship, but had mixed results in his wrestling career there. Boetsch had trouble settling into the right weight-class, and was not consistent. His college roommate, who was also on the wrestling team, had been training with the legendary Pat Miletich after he left college. Boetsch's roommate then offered Boetsch the opportunity to fight in Iowa, and Boetsch, who was landscaping in Pennsylvania at the time, accepted.

Mixed martial arts career

Early career
Boetsch had his first amateur fight in August 2006, and after dominating the first two opponents he faced in less than two minutes, made his transition to the professional ranks. Boetsch made his IFL debut as a late replacement to fight veteran Vladimir Matyushenko. He was given three days to prepare for the match, and fought the future champion to a decision, his first professional loss.

Ultimate Fighting Championship
After this performance, Boetsch made his UFC debut at UFC 81 as a late replacement to fight David Heath. He was given ten days to prepare for the fight, and won by TKO in the first round. Boetsch received particular acclaim and a fan following for the way he threw Heath onto his head at the end of the fight. Boetsch next made his main card debut in the UFC as a replacement to fight Matt Hamill at UFC Fight Night 13 with six weeks to prepare for the fight. Though he opened a large gash on Hamill's lower lip, he found himself winded in the second round, leading to a TKO loss due to strikes from the ground.

Boetsch fought submission specialist Michael Patt at UFC 88. For the first time in four fights, Boetsch did not enter the bout as a replacement for another fighter. Boetsch won by TKO in the first round.

Boetsch was released from the UFC following his loss to Jason Brilz at UFC 96, ending his four-fight contract with a 2–2 record.

Boetsch earned a record of 3-0 before getting re-signed with the UFC.

Return to the UFC
Boetsch was scheduled to face Thiago Silva on August 7, 2010, at UFC 117, but Silva was forced out of the bout due to an injury.  and replaced by UFC newcomer Todd Brown. Boetsch won a unanimous decision.

Boetsch faced Phil Davis on November 20, 2010, at UFC 123. He lost the fight via submission .

Boetsch subsequently dropped down to the Middleweight division. He faced Kendall Grove on May 28, 2011, at UFC 130 and won the fight via unanimous decision.

Boetsch faced Nick Ring on September 24, 2011, at UFC 135. He won the fight via unanimous decision.

Boetsch was victorious in his fight against former UFC title challenger Yushin Okami on February 26, 2012, at UFC 144. Boetsch was badly beaten in the first two rounds before rallying to claim a TKO victory in what is arguably the biggest victory of his career to date. Veteran commentator Joe Rogan stated it as the greatest comeback in UFC history.

Boetsch was expected to face Michael Bisping on July 21, 2012, at UFC 149.  However, Bisping was forced out of the bout with an injury and replaced by promotional newcomer Héctor Lombard. Boetsch defeated Lombard via split decision.

Boetsch was expected to face Chris Weidman on December 29, 2012, at UFC 155.  However, Weidman was forced out of the bout due citing an injury and was replaced by Costas Philippou. Boetsch had dominated the first round, but he received an eye poke and headbutt later in the fight and was bleeding a significant amount. Boetsch was never able to fully recover and slowed down significantly. He eventually lost the fight via TKO due to strikes, making this his first loss since moving to Middleweight.

Boetsch faced Mark Muñoz on July 6, 2013, at UFC 162, He lost the fight via unanimous decision.

Boetsch was expected to face Luke Rockhold on October 19, 2013, at UFC 166.  However, Rockhold was forced out of the bout citing a knee injury and was replaced by C. B. Dollaway. While Dollaway seemingly controlled the action for the majority of the bout, he was docked a point for multiple eye pokes to Boetsch.  Boetsch was declared the winner via split decision.

Boetsch eventually faced Luke Rockhold on April 26, 2014, at UFC 172. He lost the fight via submission in the first round.

Boetsch faced Brad Tavares on August 16, 2014, at UFC Fight Night 47. Boetsch scored a come from behind victory, defeating Tavares via second round TKO.  The win also earned Boetsch his first Performance of the Night bonus award.

Boetsch next faced Thales Leites on January 31, 2015, at UFC 183. He lost the fight via technical submission due to an arm-triangle choke in the second round.  Despite the loss, Boetsch was awarded a Fight of the Night bonus.

Boetsch faced Dan Henderson on June 6, 2015, in the main event at UFC Fight Night 68. He lost the fight via knockout in the first round.

Boetsch faced Ed Herman in a light heavyweight bout on January 17, 2016, at UFC Fight Night 81. He lost the fight via TKO in the second round.

Boetsch next faced Josh Samman on July 13, 2016, at UFC Fight Night 91. He won the fight via TKO in the second round.

Boetsch faced Rafael Natal on November 12, 2016, at UFC 205. He won the fight via TKO in the first round.

In the last fight of his contract, Boetsch faced Ronaldo Souza on February 11, 2017, at UFC 208. He lost the fight via submission in the first round.

Boetsch faced Johny Hendricks on June 25, 2017, at UFC Fight Night 112. He won the fight via TKO due to a head kick and punches early in the second round. The win also earned Boetsch his second Performance of the Night bonus award.

Boetsch faced Antônio Carlos Júnior on April 14, 2018, at UFC on Fox 29. He lost the fight via a rear-naked choke on round one.

Boetsch faced Omari Akhmedov on March 9, 2019, at UFC Fight Night 146. He lost the fight by unanimous decision.

In September 2019, Boetsch announced that he had retired.

Personal life
Boetsch is married and has two sons and a daughter.

Boetsch has a degree in Criminal Justice from the Lock Haven University of Pennsylvania. He was formerly a social worker with adolescents prior to pursuing his mixed martial arts career, and he now owns a lawn and landscape business.

Championships and accomplishments

Mixed martial arts
5150 Combat League
5150 Light Heavyweight Championship (One time)
Tequila CAZADORES Spirit Award
Tequila CAZADORES Spirit Award (Two times)
Ultimate Fighting Championship
Fight of the Night (One time) vs. Thales Leites 
Performance of the Night (Two times) vs. Brad Tavares and vs. Johny Hendricks

Mixed martial arts record

|-
|Loss
|align=center|21–13
|Omari Akhmedov
|Decision (unanimous)
|UFC Fight Night: Lewis vs. dos Santos 
|
|align=center|3
|align=center|5:00
|Wichita, Kansas, United States
|
|-
|Loss
|align=center|21–12
|Antônio Carlos Júnior
|Submission (rear-naked choke)
|UFC on Fox: Poirier vs. Gaethje
|
|align=center|1
|align=center|4:28
|Glendale, Arizona, United States
|
|-
|Win
|align=center|21–11
|Johny Hendricks
|TKO (head kick and punches)
|UFC Fight Night: Chiesa vs. Lee
|
|align=center|2
|align=center|0:46
|Oklahoma City, Oklahoma, United States
|
|-
|Loss
|align=center|20–11
|Ronaldo Souza
|Submission (kimura)
|UFC 208
|
|align=center|1
|align=center|3:41
|Brooklyn, New York, United States
|
|-
|Win
|align=center|20–10
|Rafael Natal
|KO (punches)
|UFC 205
|
|align=center|1
|align=center|3:22
|New York City, New York, United States
|  
|-
|Win
|align=center|19–10
|Josh Samman
|TKO (punches)
|UFC Fight Night: McDonald vs. Lineker
|
|align=center|2
|align=center|3:49
|Sioux Falls, South Dakota, United States
|
|-
|Loss
|align=center|18–10
|Ed Herman
|TKO (knee and punches)
|UFC Fight Night: Dillashaw vs. Cruz
|
|align=center|2
|align=center|1:39
|Boston, Massachusetts, United States
|     
|-
|Loss
|align=center|18–9
|Dan Henderson
|KO (punches)
|UFC Fight Night: Boetsch vs. Henderson
|
|align=center|1
|align=center|0:28
|New Orleans, Louisiana, United States
|
|-
|Loss
|align=center|18–8
|Thales Leites
|Technical Submission (arm-triangle choke)
|UFC 183
|
|align=center|2
|align=center|3:45
|Las Vegas, Nevada, United States
|
|-
|Win
|align=center|18–7
|Brad Tavares
|TKO (punches)
|UFC Fight Night: Bader vs. St. Preux
|
|align=center|2
|align=center|3:18
|Bangor, Maine, United States
|
|-
|Loss
|align=center|17–7
| Luke Rockhold
|Submission (inverted triangle kimura)
|UFC 172
|
|align=center|1
|align=center|2:08
|Baltimore, Maryland, United States
|
|-
|Win
|align=center|17–6
| C. B. Dollaway
|Decision (split)
|UFC 166
|
|align=center|3
|align=center|5:00
|Houston, Texas, United States
|
|-
|Loss
|align=center|16–6
| Mark Muñoz
|Decision (unanimous)
|UFC 162
|
|align=center|3
|align=center|5:00
|Las Vegas, Nevada, United States
|
|-
|Loss
|align=center|16–5
| Costas Philippou
|TKO (punches)
|UFC 155
|
|align=center|3
|align=center|2:11
|Las Vegas, Nevada, United States
|
|-
|Win
|align=center|16–4
| Héctor Lombard
|Decision (split)
|UFC 149
|
|align=center|3
|align=center|5:00
|Calgary, Alberta, Canada
|
|-
|Win
|align=center|15–4
| Yushin Okami
|TKO (punches)
|UFC 144
|
|align=center|3
|align=center|0:54
|Saitama, Japan
|
|-
|Win
|align=center|14–4
| Nick Ring
|Decision (unanimous)
|UFC 135
|
|align=center|3
|align=center|5:00
|Denver, Colorado, United States
|
|-
|Win
|align=center|13–4
| Kendall Grove
|Decision (unanimous)
|UFC 130
|
|align=center|3
|align=center|5:00
|Las Vegas, Nevada, United States
|
|-
|Loss
|align=center|12–4
| Phil Davis
|Submission (modified kimura)
|UFC 123
|
|align=center|2
|align=center|2:55
|Auburn Hills, Michigan, United States
|
|-
|Win
|align=center|12–3
| Todd Brown
|Decision (unanimous)
|UFC 117 
|
|align=center|3
|align=center|5:00
|Oakland, California, United States
|
|-
|Win
|align=center|11–3
| Reese Shaner
|KO (head kick)
|NAFC: Stand Your Ground
|
|align=center|1
|align=center|1:05
|West Allis, Wisconsin, United States
|
|-
|Win
|align=center|10–3
| Rudy Lindsey
|Submission (guillotine choke)
|5150 Combat League
|
|align=center|2
|align=center|1:55
|Tulsa, Oklahoma, United States
|
|-
|Win
|align=center|9–3
| Aaron Stark
|Technical Submission (guillotine choke)
|KOTC: Thunderstruck
|
|align=center|2
|align=center|1:18
|Everett, Washington, United States
|
|-
|Loss
|align=center| 8–3
| Jason Brilz
|Decision (unanimous)
|UFC 96
|
|align=center|3
|align=center|5:00
|Columbus, Ohio, United States
|
|-
|Win
|align=center|8–2
| Michael Patt
|TKO (punches)
|UFC 88
|
|align=center|1
|align=center|2:03
|Atlanta, Georgia, United States
|
|-
|Loss
|align=center|7–2
| Matt Hamill
|TKO (punches)
|UFC Fight Night: Florian vs. Lauzon
|
|align=center|2
|align=center|1:25
|Broomfield, Colorado, United States
| 
|-
|Win
|align=center|7–1
| David Heath
|TKO (punches)
|UFC 81
|
|align=center|1
|align=center|4:52
|Las Vegas, Nevada, United States
| 
|-
|Loss
|align=center|6–1
| Vladimir Matyushenko
|Decision (unanimous)
|IFL: 2007 Semifinals
|
|align=center|3
|align=center|4:00
|East Rutherford, New Jersey, United States
| 
|-
|Win
|align=center|6–0
| Brendan Barrett
|Technical Submission (guillotine choke)
|Extreme Challenge 81
|
|align=center|2
|align=center|3:00
|West Orange, New Jersey, United States
|
|-
|Win
|align=center|5–0
| Oleg Savitsky
|KO (knees)
|Extreme Challenge 78
|
|align=center|1
|align=center|3:27
|Asbury Park, New Jersey, United States
| 
|-
|Win
|align=center|4–0
| Lewis Pascavage
|TKO (knee and punches)
|Reality Fighting 15
|
|align=center|1
|align=center|0:20
|Atlantic City, New Jersey, United States
| 
|-
|Win
|align=center|3–0
| Hazim Ibrahim
|TKO (submission to punches)
|Extreme Challenge 75
|
|align=center|1
|align=center|1:10
|Trenton, New Jersey, United States
| 
|-
|Win
|align=center|2–0
| Hazim Ibrahim
|KO (punch)
|Reality Fighting 14
|
|align=center|1
|align=center|3:47
|Atlantic City, New Jersey, United States
|
|-
|Win
|align=center|1–0
| Demian Decorah
|TKO (submission to punches)
|Madtown Throwdown 9
|
|align=center|3
|align=center|1:27
|Madison, Wisconsin, United States
|
|}

See also
 List of current UFC fighters
 List of male mixed martial artists

References

External links

Official UFC Profile

Official Website

1981 births
Living people
American Jeet Kune Do practitioners
Mixed martial artists from Maine
Mixed martial artists utilizing Jeet Kune Do
Mixed martial artists utilizing collegiate wrestling
American male mixed martial artists
Light heavyweight mixed martial artists
People from Lincolnville, Maine
People from Waldo County, Maine
Middleweight mixed martial artists
Ultimate Fighting Championship male fighters